Chatham High School is a public high school in Chatham, Virginia. Average attendance is 650 students per year. Between 2008 and 2010, it was renovated along with other Pittsylvania County schools – Tunstall Sr. High School, Dan River High School, and Gretna High School. Chatham High School is named for William Pitt, Earl of Chatham.

Clubs
Chatham High School has several clubs, including:
 Beta Club
 Interact Club
 Foreign Language Club
 Project Discovery
 FIRST Robotics
 Band & Chorus
 FCCLA
 FBLA
 DECA
 FCA
 SCA
 Chess
 FFA
 ACE
 Anime/Manga Club
 Drama Club

Teams
Chatham High School has many sports teams, including:
 Soccer
 Cross-Country
 Track
 Football
 Basketball
 Volleyball
 Golf
 Baseball
 Softball
 Marching Band
 Wrestling
 Cheerleading

References

External links
 Official Website

Public high schools in Virginia
Schools in Pittsylvania County, Virginia
1964 establishments in Virginia